Igrejas de Cristo is a denomination of Mozambique. It is a Protestant church with 
approximately  200 congregations. It has at least a thousand members.

References 

World Christian Encyclopedia, 2001 edition, Volume 1, page 517

External links

Churches in Mozambique